Amina Mustafa Gamal (born on 27 May 1941) known as Mimi Gamal (in traditional Arabic Mimi Jamal) is an Egyptian actress with many roles on films, television and on stage.

Biography
Born in Shubra, Cairo, Gamal started her career as a child actress in Stronger Than Love (in Arabic أقوى من الحب). She took part in major roles in a great number of films such as El Hub Keda, My Husband’s Wife, Sunset and Sunrise, لصوص لكن ظرفاء، شيء من الحب، عالم عيال عيال، سفاح كرموز and in a great number of Egyptian television series, notably in Al Hagg Metwalli's Family (عائلة الحاج متولي), Al Batiniyyah (الباطنية) and Abdel Azeez Street (شارع عبد العزيز). She has also had significant roles in a great number of stage productions, like the famous Number 2 Wins (نمرة 2 يكسب) and Nest of Fools (عش المجانين).

Personal life
She was born in 1941 to an Egyptian father and a Greek - Armenian mother. She was married to Egyptian actor Hassan Mostapha. They married in June 1966 and had two daughters. Mostapha died on 15 May 2015.

References 

Egyptian actresses
1941 births
Living people
Egyptian people of Greek descent
Actresses from Cairo